Miss World 2018, the 68th edition of the Miss World pageant, was held on 8 December 2018 at the Sanya City Arena in Sanya, China. Manushi Chhillar of India crowned her successor Vanessa Ponce of Mexico at the end of the event. She is the first Mexican woman to win Miss World.

Background

Result

Continental Queens of Beauty

Order of announcements

Top 30

Top 12

Top 5

Challenge events

Head-to-Head Challenge

Round 1
  Advanced to Round 2 of the Head-to-Head Challenge.
  Advanced to Round 2 of the Head-to-Head Challenge, but advanced to the Top 30 via judges' choice or a challenge event other than Head-to-Head Challenge.
  Advanced to the Top 30 via a challenge event other than Head-to-Head Challenge.
  Advanced to the Top 30 via judges' choice.

Round 2
  Advanced to the Top 30 via the Head-to-Head challenge.

Top Model
Miss France, Maëva Coucke won the Top Model Competition and became the first quarter-finalist of Miss World 2018.

Talent
Miss Japan, Kanako Date won the Talent Competition and became the second quarter-finalist of Miss World 2018.

Sports
Miss United States, Marisa Butler won the Sports Competition and became the third quarter-finalist of Miss World 2018.

Multimedia
Miss Nepal, Shrinkhala Khatiwada won the Multimedia Challenge, securing her place in the finals of Miss World 2018.

Beauty With A Purpose
The Top 5 winners of the Beauty with a purpose Award (Miss Nepal, Indonesia, New Zealand, Mexico & Vietnam) became the quarter-finalists of Miss World 2018. The 25 projects that were shortlisted are:

Global Vote

World Fashion Designer Award
Miss South Africa, Thulisa Keyi and Miss China, Peirui Mao emerged as the joint winners of the Designer Award.

Sanya Tourism Promotional Video Award
Miss Kenya, Finali Galaiya won the Sanya Tourism Promotional Video award.

Contestants
118 contestants competed for the title:

Notes

Returns
Last competed in 2014:
 
 
 

Last competed in 2016:

Designations

Replacements

Withdrawals

  - Joyce Delgado; Did not compete for an unknown reason, will compete in 2019
  - Fatem Suy
 
 
 
 
 
 
  — Due to internal problems of citing costs of the pageant. Miss Seychelles 2018 is cancelled.
  — Amanda Wiberg
  — Haifa Ghedir

References

External links
 

Miss World
2018 beauty pageants
Beauty pageants in China